= Anna Weiler =

Anna Weiler (died 6 March 1458, Strasbourg), was a German Waldensian preacher. She was active in Strasbourg with the male preacher Friedrich Reiser. They were both arrested and investigated by the Inquisition and subjected to a several months long heresy trial, which included torture. They were both convicted of heresy and burned alive at the stake.
